The Regiment "Lancieri di Aosta" (6th) ( - "Lancers of Aosta") is a cavalry unit of the Italian Army based in Palermo in Sicily. The regiment is the reconnaissance unit of the Mechanized Brigade "Aosta".

History

Formation 
On 16 September 1774 the Cavalry Regiment "Aosta" was formed in Voghera by order of the King of Sardinia Victor Amadeus III, who made his fifteen-year-old son Victor Emmanuel, Duke of Aosta the regiment's honorary colonel. Victor Emmanuel named the regiment for his Duchy of Aosta. The regiment consisted of three squadrons, with each squadron consisting of two companies. The squadrons had been transferred from three existing cavalry regiments: Regiment "Dragoni del Génévois", Cavalry Regiment "Piemonte Reale", and Cavalry Regiment "Savoia". In April 1778 the regiment formed a fourth squadron.

In 1792 King Victor Amadeus III joined the War of the First Coalition against the French Republic and the regiment had its baptism of fire in the County of Nice against French troops. From 1792 to 1796 the regiment fought against the French Army of Italy. In March 1796 Napoleon Bonaparte arrived in Italy and took command of the French forces, with which he defeated the Royal Sardinian Army in the Montenotte campaign within a month. On 28 April 1796 King Victor Amadeus III had to sign the Armistice of Cherasco and on 15 May 1796 the Treaty of Paris, which forced Sardinia out of the First Coalition. Victor Amadeus III also had to cede the Duchy of Savoy and the County of Nice to France. On 16 October 1796 Victor Amadeus III died and his eldest son Charles Emmanuel IV ascended the throne. On 26 October 1796 King Charles Emmanuel IV ordered to disband the two youngest cavalry regiments: "Dragoni del Chiablese" and "Aosta".

Italian Wars of Independence 
On 3 November 1831 the Regiment "Aosta Cavalleria" was reformed as a Lancer unit with six squadrons in Vercelli by order of King Charles Albert. The regiment participated in the First Italian War of Independence, during which the regiment fought in 1848 at the battles of Goito Bridge, Mantua, Santa Lucia, Goito, Sommacampagna and Custoza. In 1849 the regiment distinguished itself at the Battle of Novara for which it was awarded a Silver Medal of Military Valour.

After the defeat in the First Italian War of Independence the Kingdom of Sardinia reformed its military and on 3 January 1850 the Aosta was reorganized as a Chevau-léger unit and renamed Regiment "Cavalleggeri di Aosta". On the same date the regiment was reduced to four squadrons, with the Aosta's 5th and 6th squadron used to form the Regiment "Cavalleggeri di Alessandria". In 1855 the Aosta's 1st Squadron was part of the Sardinian expeditionary corps' Provisional Light Cavalry Regiment, which fought in the Crimean War and distinguished itself on 16 August 1855 in the Battle of the Chernaya.

During the Second Italian War of Independence the regiment fought at Castelnuovo Scrivia, Montebello, and San Martino, and participated in the siege of Peschiera. On 6 June 1860 the regiment was reorganized as Lancer unit and renamed Regiment "Lancieri di Aosta". In 1863-64 the regiment operated in the Capitanata and Murge areas to suppress the anti-Sardinian revolt in Southern Italy after the Kingdom of Sardinia had invaded and annexed the Kingdom of Two Sicilies.

During the Third Italian War of Independence the regiment fought on 24 June 1866 at the Battle of Custoza, where the regiment charged the Austrian lines 14 times to allow the Italian I Division to retreat from the Austrian Imperial advance. For this feat the regiment became only the second cavalry regiment and the only cavalry regiment in the 19th century to be awarded Italy's highest military honor the Gold Medal of Military Valour. After the Italian Army had crossed the Po on 7 July the regiment rapidly advanced northwards reaching Udine on the 25th of the same month.

In 1870 the regiment participated in the Capture of Rome. Over the next years the regiment repeatedly changed its name:

 10 September 1871: 6th Regiment of Cavalry (Aosta)
 5 November 1876: Cavalry Regiment "Aosta" (6th)
 16 December 1897: Regiment "Lancieri di Aosta" (6th)

In 1887 the regiment contributed to the formation of the Mounted Hunters Squadron, which fought in the Italo-Ethiopian War of 1887–1889. In 1895-96 the regiment provided one officer and 69 enlisted for units deployed to Italian Eritrea for the First Italo-Ethiopian War. In 1911-12 the regiment provided four officers and 140 enlisted to augment units fighting in the Italo-Turkish War. Between the Second Italian War of Independence and World War I the Aosta ceded on three occasions one of its squadrons to help form new regiments:

 16 September 1859: Regiment "Cavalleggeri di Montebello" (8th) (later renamed Regiment "Lancieri di Montebello" (8th))
 16 February 1864: Regiment "Cavalleggeri di Caserta" 17th)
 1 October 1909: Regiment "Lancieri di Vercelli" (26th)

World War I 
At the outbreak of World War I the regiment consisted of a command, the regimental depot, and two cavalry groups, with the I Group consisting of three squadrons and the II Group consisting of two squadrons and a machine gun section. Together with the Regiment "Lancieri di Mantova" (25th) the Aosta formed the IV Cavalry Brigade of the 2nd Cavalry Division of "Veneto". The regiment fought dismounted in the trenches of the Italian Front: until 17 November 1915 on the lower Isonzo and from May 1916 onward on the Asiago plateau, where the Austro-Hungarian army tried to break through the Italian lines.

In 1917 the regimental depot in Ferrara formed the 851st Dismounted Machine Gunners Company as reinforcement for infantry units on the front. During the Eleventh Battle of the Isonzo the regiment fought on the Banjšice Plateau. After the defeat in the Battle of Caporetto the regiment covered the Italian retreat to the Piave river, fighting rearguard actions at Cividale del Friuli and Fagagna.

In 1918, after the Italian victory at the Battle of Vittorio Veneto, the regiment, like all cavalry regiments, was ordered to advance as fast as far as possible and to take the bridges over the Tagliamento and Isonzo rivers. The Aosta took the bridge over the Tagliamento at Latisana on 3 November 1918 and charged Austro-Hungarian defenses at Corgnolo on 4 November, the last day of the war. For the capture of the bridge and the last charge of the war the regiment received a Bronze Medal of Military Valour.

Interwar years 
After the war the Italian Army disbanded 14 of its 30 cavalry regiments and so on 21 November 1919 the II Group of the Aosta was renamed "Cavalleggeri di Caserta" as it consisted of personnel and horses from the disbanded Regiment "Cavalleggeri di Caserta" (17th). On 20 May 1920 the Aosta lost its lances and was renamed Regiment "Cavalleggeri di Aosta". On the same day the Aosta received and integrated a squadron of the disbanded Regiment "Lancieri di Milano" (7th) and received the traditions of the regiments "Cavalleggeri di Caserta" (17th).

On 1 March 1930 the regiment formed the 5th Machine Gunners Squadron equipped with eight heavy machine guns, 15 trucks for the regimental train, twelve motorbikes, and three R/3 radios. In 1932 the regiment moved from Ferrara to Naples. On 8 February 1934 the regiment was renamed Regiment "Lancieri di Aosta".

Second Italo-Ethiopian War 
In June 1935 regiment formed the III and IV truck-transported machine gunners groups. Each group fielded three machine gunners squadrons of 120 men and one command squadron of 60 men. The two groups, together with the I and II groups formed by the Regiment "Genova Cavalleria" (4th), were deployed to Italian Somaliland for the Second Italo-Ethiopian War. On 20 January 1936 the four groups participated in the conquest of Neghelli, for which the III and IV groups were awarded a Bronze Medal of Military Valour, which today are affixed to the flag of the Aosta. On 1 January 1937 the four groups were given the honor title "Cavalieri di Neghelli" ("Knights of Neghelli"). After their return to Italy in late spring 1937 the III and IV truck-mounted machine gunners groups were disbanded.

For the Italian military intervention in the Spanish Civil War the Aosta was ordered to provide a platoon of 64 volunteers. On 7 April 1939 the Aosta's regimental command and the I Squadrons Group participated in the Italian invasion of Albania.

World War II 
At the outbreak of World War II the regiment consisted of a command, a command squadron, the I and II squadrons groups, each with two mounted squadrons, and the 5th Machine Gunners Squadron. The regiment's personnel strength was 37 officers, 810 enlisted, 758 saddle horses, 52 pack horses, 36 machine pistols, 12 machine guns, 31 bicycles, 6 motorbikes and 15 trucks.

In 1940 the Aosta was deployed to Albania, where the Aosta, together with the Regiment "Lancieri di Milano" (7th), Regiment "Cavalleggeri Guide" (19th), and 3rd Regiment "Granatieri di Sardegna e d'Albania" formed the Littoral Grouping for the Italian invasion of Greece, formed the Littoral Grouping on the extreme right during the initial stages of the Italian invasion of Greece. On 28 October 1940 the invasion began, but it quickly devolved into a military disaster. On 10 November 1940 the Aosta crossed the enemy lines to raid Greek depots at Paramythia, for which the regiment was awarded a War Cross of Military Valour. After its return to Italian lines the regiment spent the rest of the war on the defensive until Nazi Germany's Wehrmacht invaded Yugoslavia and Greece. After the German defeat of Greece the Aosta was on occupation duty in Athens and Piraeus.

During the war the regiment's depot in Naples formed the:
 Command 2nd Dismounted Grouping "Lancieri di Aosta"
 VI Machine Gunners Group "Lancieri di Aosta"
 VIII Dismounted Group "Lancieri di Aosta"
 IX Dismounted Group "Lancieri di Aosta"
 XXI Dismounted Group "Lancieri di Aosta"
 XXIII Dismounted Group "Lancieri di Aosta"
 XXVIII Dismounted Group "Lancieri di Aosta"
 XXX Dismounted Group "Lancieri di Aosta"
 XXXI Dismounted Group "Lancieri di Aosta"
 LVII Dismounted Group "Lancieri di Aosta"
 XXVI Road Movement Battalion "Lancieri di Aosta"

The VI Machine Gunners Group "Lancieri di Aosta" was sent to Libya for the Western Desert Campaign. The group arrived in Tobruk in September 1941 and was attached to the 102nd Motorized Division "Trento". The VI Squadrons Group remained in the North African theater until its remnants surrendered to Allied Forces at the end of the Tunisian Campaign in 1943.

In 1942 the Aosta regiment remained on garrison duty in Greece between the Corinth Canal and Megara, and later in Lamia and Larissa, where the regiment skirmished with Greek partisans.

On 8 September 1943 the regiment was dislocated between Trikala and Karditsa in Greece, when it was informed of the Armistice of Cassibile. Without orders from the Italian High Command, the Aosta's commander Colonel Giuseppe Berti refused German demands to surrender, contacted the British Middle East Command in Cairo, placed his unit under British command, and marched it into the Pindus Mountains, where the regiment, together with the 24th Infantry Division "Pinerolo" joined the Greek partisans of the Greek People's Liberation Army and National Republican Greek League. In Greece the regiment had been reinforced with the XXXI Dismounted Group "Lancieri di Aosta" and one battery from the 18th Artillery Regiment "Pinerolo", bringing the regiment's strength on 10 September 1943 to 48 officers, 1,718 enlisted, around 800 horses, 52 machine pistols, 38 machine guns, 31 bicycles, 6 motorbikes and 15 trucks.

In coming weeks the regiment clashed with German forces at Kalabaka and 100 men raided the Luftwaffe's air field at Larissa. On 14 October 1944 ELAS partisans tried to disarm the troops of the Aosta regiment. In the ensuing fighting 20 Italians were killed and 49 wounded. By nightfall the regiment acquiesced to the demands and surrendered its weapons. Although the regiment managed to transfer its flag to a Royal Navy ship and return the flag to Italy on 28 October 1943, the remaining personnel of the regiment were only repatriated in early 1945.

Cold War 
On 15 July 1951 the 6th Armored Cavalry Regiment "Lancieri di Aosta" was formed in Bologna. The regiment consisted of a command, a command squadron, and three squadrons groups equipped with a mix of donated US Army armored fighting vehicles (M3 Scout Car, M8 Greyhound, M5 Stuart, M24 Chaffee, M47 Patton). On 8 November 1951 the regiment moved from Bologna to Reggio Emilia. The regiment was assigned to the Infantry Division "Trieste" until 20 October 1954, when it was assigned to the VI Military Territorial Command.

On 4 November 1958 the regiment was renamed Regiment "Lancieri di Aosta" (6th). On 15 September 1964 the regiment and its III Squadrons Group were disbanded. The next day the regiment's I Squadrons Group was renamed Squadrons Group "Lancieri di Aosta", while the regiment's II Squadrons Group was renamed Squadrons Group "Cavalleggeri di Saluzzo". The Squadrons Group "Lancieri di Aosta" moved from Reggio Emilia to Cervignano del Friuli, where it joined the Infantry Division "Mantova" as divisional reconnaissance unit.

During the 1975 army reform the army disbanded the regimental level and newly independent battalions were granted for the first time their own flags. On 1 October 1975 the squadrons group was reorganized and renamed 6th Tank Squadrons Group "Lancieri di Aosta" and assigned the flag and traditions of the Regiment "Lancieri di Aosta" (6th). The squadrons group was assigned to the Armored Brigade "Vittorio Veneto" and consisted of a command, a command and services squadron, and three tank squadrons equipped with Leopard 1A2 main battle tanks.

For its conduct and work after the 1976 Friuli earthquake the squadrons group was awarded a Bronze Medal of Army Valour, which was affixed to the squadron group's flag and added to the squadron group's coat of arms.

Recent times 
On 7 May 1991 the regiment moved from Cervignano del Friuli to Palermo, where it joined the Motorized Brigade "Aosta". On 2 March 1992 the 6th Tank Squadrons Group "Lancieri di Aosta" lost its autonomy and the next day the squadrons group entered the newly formed Regiment "Lancieri di Aosta" (6th). The regiment consisted of a command, a command and services squadron, and a squadrons group with three armored squadrons equipped with wheeled Centauro tank destroyers.

Current structure 
As of 2022 the Regiment "Lancieri di Aosta" (6th) consists of:

  Regimental Command, in Palermo
 Command and Logistic Support Squadron
 1st Reconnaissance Squadrons Group "Montevento"
 1st Reconnaissance Squadron "Custoza"
 2nd Reconnaissance Squadron "Novara"
 3rd Reconnaissance Squadron "Corgnolo"
 Heavy Armored Squadron "Neghelli"

The Command and Logistic Support Squadron fields the following platoons: C3 Platoon, Transport and Materiel Platoon, Medical Platoon, and Commissariat Platoon. The three reconnaissance squadrons are equipped with VTLM Lince vehicles and Centauro tank destroyers, the latter of which are scheduled to be replaced by Freccia reconnaissance vehicles. The Heavy Armor Squadron is equipped with Centauro tank destroyers, which are being replaced by Centauro II tank destroyers.

Missions in the national territory 
 Operation Sicilian Vespers
 Operation Domino
 Operation Strade Sicure

See also 
 Mechanized Brigade "Aosta"

External links
 Italian Army Website: Reggimento "Lancieri di Aosta" (6°)

References

Cavalry Regiments of Italy